Gifflenga is a comune (municipality) in the Province of Biella in the Italian region Piedmont, located about  northeast of Turin and about  southeast of Biella. 

Gifflenga borders the following municipalities: Buronzo, Castelletto Cervo, Mottalciata.

References

Cities and towns in Piedmont